John Edwards (1831 – December 27, 1902) was a Union Navy sailor in the American Civil War and a recipient of the U.S. military's highest decoration, the Medal of Honor, for his actions at the Battle of Mobile Bay.

Biography
Born in 1831 in Providence, Rhode Island, Edwards was still living in that city when he joined the Navy. Refusing to leave his post, he instead took over for the first captain and continued to man the gun for the remainder of the battle. For this action, he was awarded the Medal of Honor four months later, on December 31, 1864.

Edwards's official Medal of Honor citation reads:
As second captain of a gun on board the U.S.S. Lackawanna during successful attacks against Fort Morgan, rebel gunboats and the ram Tennessee in Mobile Bay, on 5 August 1864. Wounded when an enemy shell struck, Edwards refused to go below for aid and, as heavy return fire continued to strike his vessel, took the place of the first captain and carried out his duties during the prolonged action which resulted in the capture of the prize ram Tennessee and in the damaging and destruction of batteries at Fort Morgan.

Edwards died on December 27, 1902, at age 70 or 71 and was buried in Cranston, Rhode Island.

See also

List of American Civil War Medal of Honor recipients: A–F

References

External links

1831 births
1902 deaths
People from Providence, Rhode Island
People of Rhode Island in the American Civil War
Union Navy sailors
United States Navy Medal of Honor recipients
American Civil War recipients of the Medal of Honor
Burials in Rhode Island